Vildósola is a surname. Notable people with the surname include:

Gus Vildósola (born 1953), Mexican off-road racing driver and businessman
Tavo Vildósola (born 1982), Mexican off-road racing driver

See also
Vildosola Racing, off-road racing team